From the Hip, is a 1987 American courtroom comedy-drama film directed by Bob Clark from a screenplay by Clark and David E. Kelley. The film stars Judd Nelson, Elizabeth Perkins, John Hurt, Ray Walston, and Darren McGavin.

Plot
Fresh out of law school, Robin "Stormy" Weathers (Judd Nelson) cannot stand the tedium of case filing and research. Desperately wanting to "practice law" and go to trial, one morning he intentionally withholds the fact that a trial is scheduled to begin that very afternoon to compel his superiors to let him try the case because he is the only one familiar with the facts of the case. During his meeting with the client (the president of a bank who intentionally struck another banker), the banker declares the "simple assault case" to be a no-winner (explaining that he hits people all the time), but wants the one-day trial to somehow be stretched to three days to run up the other banker's court fees.

Weathers prolongs the case by creating a 1st Amendment constitutional challenge as to the admissibility of the word "asshole". Escalating the case into a media frenzy, the senior partners of the law firm are embarrassed by Weathers' behavior and unconventional methods and try to fire him. The client retaliates on Weathers' behalf threatening to take the bank's business elsewhere. Weathers appears to be crafty and intuitive, but in reality, had conspired with the other attorney (a friend of his) to stage a brilliant legal engagement to make themselves look good. Weathers wins the trial and in doing so attracts a plethora of new clients to the firm which skyrockets him to be a junior partner.

In an act of unfair retaliation, Weathers is assigned to be lead defense counsel in a first-degree murder case involving university professor Douglas Benoit (John Hurt) who is almost certainly guilty of bludgeoning a prostitute to death with the claw of a hammer. Benoit wanted Weathers because he saw him in the previous case. Weathers takes the case and his loud and odd courtroom behavior soon amazes the judge, the spectators and sometimes embarrasses his girlfriend Jo Ann (Elizabeth Perkins). Determined to impress his employers by winning a verdict of not guilty, no matter what, his courtroom antics soon visibly gain even the jury's favor and raise the likelihood of acquittal.

Weathers unsuccessfully tries to get Benoit to accept a plea-bargain to manslaughter charges and soon discovers that Benoit is guilty: in a thinly-veiled confession used to taunt his own defense attorney, Benoit vividly describes to him the "clarity of mind" it takes for a man to be able to split someone's skull open with the claw of a hammer... while the person remains alive. Weathers becomes conflicted between his sense of duty and ethics and his moral obligation to see Benoit pay for his crime. Despite the possibility of being disbarred, he decides to antagonize Benoit into a confession on the stand.

Cast

 Judd Nelson as Robin 'Stormy' Weathers
 Elizabeth Perkins as Jo Ann
 John Hurt as Douglas Benoit
 Darren McGavin as Craig Duncan
 Dan Monahan as Larry
 David Alan Grier as Steve Hadley
 Nancy Marchand as Roberta Winnaker
 Allan Arbus as Phil Ames
 Edward Winter as Raymond Torkenson
 Richard Zobel as Matt Cowens
 Ray Walston as 1st Judge
 Robert Irvin Elliott as Scott Murray
 Beatrice Winde as 2nd Judge
 Art Hindle as Lt. Matt Sosha
 Priscilla Pointer as Mrs. Martha Williams

Reception

Box office 
Released on February 6, 1987, the film grossed $9.5 million domestically.

Critical response 
Rotten Tomatoes gives the film a score of 27% based on reviews from 22 critics. The site's consensus states: "From the Hip finds Judd Nelson flexing previously unseen acting muscles, but this legal comedy is too grating to pass the bar."

Awards 
Judd Nelson was nominated for a Razzie Award as Worst Actor for his role in the film, where he lost to Bill Cosby for Leonard Part 6.

References

External links
 
 
 

1987 films
1987 comedy-drama films
American comedy-drama films
1980s English-language films
Films scored by Paul Zaza
Films shot in North Carolina
Films directed by Bob Clark
De Laurentiis Entertainment Group films
1980s American films